Aab is a surname. Notable people with the surname include:

 Jaak Aab (born 1960), Estonian politician
 Vitalij Aab (born 1979), German ice hockey player

Estonian-language surnames